Ingalagi is a village in the Kundgol taluk of Dharwad district in the Indian state of Karnataka.
Ingalagi is 30 km from Hubli and Shishuvinahala is 6 km from here.

Demographics
As of the 2011 Census of India there were 859 households in Ingalagi and a total population of 4,224 consisting of 2,178 males and 2,046 females. There were 450 children ages 0-6.

See also
Kundgol
Shishuvinahala
Hubli
Dharwad
Karnataka

References

Villages in Dharwad district